Provincial Road 206 (PR 206) is a provincial road in Manitoba, Canada, located in the Rural Municipalities of Springfield, Taché, and Hanover.

Route description
PR 206 begins at PTH 44 northeast of Winnipeg and heads south, passing through the communities of Oakbank and Dugald. Once it reaches the Trans-Canada Highway (TCH), it turns southeast and begins a three kilometre concurrence with the TCH.  The road then turns south again, passing through the hamlet of Landmark, before reaching its end at PTH 52. Aside from the TCH concurrency, PR 206 is entirely a paved, two-lane road.

PR 206 forms the eastern boundary of Birds Hill Provincial Park.  The park can be accessed via the eastern gate, located north of the PR 206 and PR 213 junction.

PR 206's junctions with PR 311 and PR 213 are considered among the most dangerous intersections in the region because of the high number of vehicle collisions at those locations.

References

External links
Official Manitoba Highway Map

206